Emilian Wehrle (1832 – 1896, born in Schönenbach (Furtwangen), was a reputed Black Forest clockmaker famous for his high-quality musical clocks. These musical clocks included the trumpeter clock, flute clock, singing bird clock, and rooster clock.  These timepieces call the hour with the sound of a trumpeter, flute, bird and rooster respectively. He was also a maker of cuckoo clocks, but these were not the primary focus of the firm.

Emilian came from a poverty-stricken farming area. His father, Konrad Wehrle (1796-1871), was a poor cottage clockmaker and farmer who, remarkably supported his family on less than a third of an acre of land. In spite of limited schooling, he proved he was an outstanding student of extreme achievements and technically very talented. With the money he saved by serving several years in the military he started his own clockmaking business in Furtwangen in 1857.

Emilian Wehrle never produced clocks in high numbers compared to other Black Forest makers. Instead he developed a niche selling his expensive musical clocks to people who could afford them.

In early 1866 Emilian formed a partnership with his next door neighbor Franz Xaver Wehrle (1819-1885), renaming the firm Emilian Wehrle & Co. Later that year on August 23, 1866, Emilian married F.X. Wehrle's daughter Norma Wehrle (1844-1901). Although both of the Wehrle families shared the same last name, there is no known blood relation between the two families until Emilain married Norma.

The gifted musical talent of the entire Wehrle clan, accompanied by outstanding skill and craftsmanship, originality and an enjoyment of tinkering, all these assets are credited for the great success of the Wehrle's, whose clocks were exported worldwide, primarily to the United States and Great Britain.
These clocks of the period were very expensive and never sold in large numbers like the more popular and much cheaper cuckoo clock. Today these clocks are very rare and command very high prices.

After Emilian's death in 1896, Emilian Wehrle's brother-in-law, and then partner in the firm Julian Wehrle took control of the factory. Within a very short period of time the firm moved away from making musical clocks, and instead specialized in the fabrication of specialized parts for other industries. Today the firm is still in business and specializes in the production of water meters and other flow metering technology.

The Emilian Wehrle's clocks are sought-after museum pieces due to its high artistic, technical and musical level that went into each of his clocks.

Bibliography 
 Miller and Wehrle, “Emilian Wehrle: The Man and His Clocks,” NAWCC Bulletin,(March–April 2012), 396.
 Kochmann, Karl (2005): Black Forest Clockmaker and the Cuckoo Clock.
 Miller, Justin (2012), Rare and Unusual Black Forest Clocks, Schiffer 2012, p. 161-165.

See also 
 Johann Baptist Beha
 Theodor Ketterer

19th-century German people
German artisans
German clockmakers
People from Furtwangen im Schwarzwald
1832 births
1896 deaths